Piero Piccioni (December 6, 1921 – July 23, 2004) was an Italian film score composer and lawyer.

A pianist, organist, conductor, composer, he was also the prolific author of more than 300 film soundtracks. He played for the first time on radio in 1938 with his “013” Big Band, to return on air only after the liberation of Italy in 1944.  “013” was the first Italian jazz band to be broadcast in Italy after the fall of Fascism.

Early life
Piero Piccioni was born in Turin, Piedmont. His mother's maiden name was Marengo, hence his pseudonym Piero Morgan, which he adopted until 1957.

When he was growing up, his father Attilio Piccioni (a prominent member of the Italian Christian Democratic Party with the post-war Italian government), would frequently take him to hear concerts at the EIAR Radio Studios in Florence. Having listened to jazz throughout his childhood (he loved the music of Art Tatum and Charlie Parker) and attending studies at the Conservatorio Luigi Cherubini, Piero Piccioni became a musician.

Career
Piccioni made his radio debut at 17 with his 013 Big Band in 1938, but only returned on air after the liberation of Italy in 1944. His 013 was the first Italian jazz band to be broadcast in Italy after the fall of Fascism.

He was influenced in the use of jazz by 20th century classical composers and American films. Directors he liked included Frank Capra, Alfred Hitchcock, Billy Wilder, and John Ford, while Alex North was a film score composer he admired. He began writing songs of his own and was soon able to get some of his works published by Carisch editions.

Piero Piccioni came into contact with the movie world in Rome during the fifties, when he was a practicing lawyer securing movie rights for Italian producers such as Titanus and De Laurentiis. During that time, Michelangelo Antonioni had called Piccioni to score a documentary film directed by Luigi Polidoro, one of his apprentices. Piccioni's first score for a feature film was Gianni Franciolini’s Il mondo le condanna (1952). He consequently changed his lawyer's "toga" for a conductor's baton. He developed close-knit working relationships with directors Francesco Rosi and Alberto Sordi, and established strong personal and professional bonds with them.

Many directors sought Piero Piccioni to score the soundtracks for their films: Francesco Rosi, Mario Monicelli, Alberto Lattuada, Luigi Comencini, Luchino Visconti, Antonio Pietrangeli, Bernardo Bertolucci, Roberto Rossellini, Vittorio De Sica, Lina Wertmuller, Tinto Brass, Dino Risi, and others.

His film scores include Il bell'Antonio, Contempt, The 10th Victim, More Than a Miracle, The Deserter, The Light at the Edge of the World, Puppet on a Chain, Lucky Luciano, Camille 2000, The Nun and the Devil, Swept Away, Christ Stopped at Eboli, Fighting Back, and many Alberto Sordi movies. He is credited with over 300 soundtracks and compositions for radio, television, ballets and orchestra. Among his favorite vocalists were female soul singer Shawn Robinson and Edinburgh-born Lydia MacDonald.

Awards and legacy
Piccioni won many prestigious prizes including the David di Donatello Award for the movie Swept Away (1975), Nastro d’argento Award for the movie Salvatore Giuliano by Francesco Rosi (1963), Prix International Lumière 1991, Anna Magnani Award 1975 and Vittorio De Sica Award 1979.

His song "Traffic Boom" was featured as the song for the fictional Logjammin''' movie-within-a-movie in The Big Lebowski.

The song "It's Possible" was sampled by DJ Khaled in "Jermaine's Interlude" on his Major Key album.

In 1953 Piccioni was implicated in the Montesi scandal, after he was identified by journalists as being the 'blond' who handed in clothes of Wilma Montesi after her death. The accusations were recanted by the journalist Marco Cesarini Sforza after legal pressure was applied.

His music is compiled into YouTube playlists and is extensively sampled by the lo-fi'' community.

Death
Piccioni died in Rome in 2004 from unknown causes.

Selected filmography

External links 
 
 
 Discography : http://www.discogs.com/search?q=piero+piccioni&btn=&type=all

1921 births
2004 deaths
Musicians from Turin
Italian film score composers
Italian male film score composers
Spaghetti Western composers
David di Donatello winners
Nastro d'Argento winners
20th-century Italian musicians
20th-century Italian male musicians